Iron Gag is the fourth studio album by American metalcore band A Life Once Lost. This album displays a much more groove metal oriented direction for the band.

Track listing

Personnel
Robert Meadows – Vocals 
Robert Carpenter – Guitar 
Douglas Sabolick – Guitar 
Nick Frasca – Bass 
Justin Graves – Drums 
Randy Blythe – Vocal Producer  
Devin Townsend – Guitar Solo on "Detest"
Anthony Green – Guest Vocalist on "All Teeth"

References

2005 albums
A Life Once Lost albums
Ferret Music albums